Holiday in the Park (known as Christmas in the Park at Six Flags México) is a Christmas event that takes place at several Six Flags parks. The event features Christmas lights along with live entertainment, and usually follows Six Flags Fright Fest in October. In 2020, Holiday in the Park was re-imagined to Holiday in the Park Lights for certain parks following the COVID-19 pandemic.

History

Six Flags started Holiday in the Park at Six Flags Over Texas in 1985. The event ran from late November to early January. During this time the park was transformed into a gigantic holiday festival, with hundreds of thousands of Christmas lights as well as special holiday shows, rides, merchandise, foods, drinks, and a giant Christmas tree in the center of the park. The event was expanded to Six Flags Astroworld in 1988. Six Flags Over Georgia held the event in 1989 and 1990 but discontinued it after 1990.

Six Flags Fiesta Texas and Six Flags Discovery Kingdom opened this event in 2007, and Great Escape in 2009. Six Flags Astroworld's last season for this event was in 1997, and the event was cancelled in 1998.  The Great Escape's event ran only for the 2009 season as Six Flags stated that the event was successful at the park, but also claimed a "business decision" was the reason behind the cancellation of the "Holiday in the Park" for the 2010 season.

Six Flags México and Six Flags Great Escape Lodge & Indoor Waterpark announced they will be celebrating a Christmas event similar to Holiday in the Park but as Christmas in the Park in Mexico and Holiday in the Lodge in New York, starting winter 2012.

In April 2014, Six Flags Magic Mountain and Six Flags Over Georgia both announced that they will host the Holiday in the Park Christmas event in late 2014 and for future years after.

Six Flags Great Adventure started having Holiday in the Park events in 2015. In 2016, Six Flags St. Louis and Six Flags America started hosting the event. In 2017, Six Flags New England began hosting the event. Six Flags Great America and Frontier City debuted Holiday in the Park in 2018.

In 2022, Holiday in the Park was removed from the event lineup of several parks, including Six Flags Great America, Six Flags New England, Six Flags America, Six Flags St. Louis, and Frontier City.

Locations

Current locations

Former locations

Re-imaginations

Winter Lights
Six Flags operated Winter Lights at Six Flags Great Adventure for the 2002-2003 and 2003–2004 seasons in November through January. It was a drive through (like the previous incarnation of Safari Off Road Adventure called Six Flags Wild Safari) with Christmas lights along the road and also with holiday rides, food, and shops.

Holiday in the Park Lights!
In 2020, due to the COVID-19 pandemic and state limitations, Six Flags Great America, Six Flags New England and Six Flags Discovery Kingdom operated Holiday in the Park Lights!. The event was specifically a light show only, with no rides operating. At Six Flags Great America, the park also ran shows during the event.

The event re-operated one last time at Six Flags Great America for the 2021 season with the re-operation of some rides, indoor theater venues, along with the Drive-Thru experience. The event ran from November through December. After this, the event was completely cut out for the 2022 season, with no word on if the event will ever happen again. At Six Flags New England, the lights-only event also ran for the last time from November through January.

Holiday in the Park Drive-Thru Experience 
In 2020, Six Flags Magic Mountain, Six Flags Great Adventure, Six Flags Great America, Six Flags Discovery Kingdom, Six Flags New England and Six Flags Fiesta Texas operated the Holiday in the Park Drive-Thru Experience, which was a drive-thru experience with lights and shows, but with no rides operating. It operated only on weekdays at Great Adventure, Fiesta Texas, New England and Great America, with the normal Holiday in the Park or Holiday in the Park Lights event on the weekend, before it operated stand-alone in 2021.

The experience operated again at Six Flags Great America and Six Flags New England from November 2021 to January 2022.

See also
 Six Flags Fright Fest

References

External links
In Pictures: Holiday in the Park
Travel Ideas: Holiday Parks
Holiday in the Park at Visit Vallejo Tourism website

Six Flags
Recurring events established in 1985
Christmas festivals
Christmas events and celebrations
Frontier City
Six Flags America
Six Flags AstroWorld
Six Flags Discovery Kingdom
Six Flags Fiesta Texas
Six Flags Great Adventure
Six Flags Great America
Six Flags Magic Mountain
Six Flags México
Six Flags New England
Six Flags Over Georgia
Six Flags Over Texas
Six Flags St. Louis
The Great Escape and Hurricane Harbor